Sunwater, the trading name of Sunwater Limited, is a statutory Queensland Government-owned corporation that supplies bulk water to over  customers and water consultancy services to a range of institutional clients in the Wide Bay–Burnett and North West regions of Queensland, Australia.

Function and activities
Water storage infrastructure managed by Sunwater includes:

 Burdekin Falls Dam
 Bjelke-Petersen Dam
 Kinchant Dam
 Wuruma Dam

SunWater constructed, and owns and operates the Tinaroo Hydro Power Station, a minihydroelectric power station at Lake Tinaroo; and the Paradise Mini-Hydro, a minihydroelectric power station at Paradise Dam, impacted by flooding near  in 2010.

History 
In 2003, there was a project underway to prevent interbasin transfer of the invasive fish species, Mozambique tilapia. The fish breeds rapidly and competes with native fish species. Sunwater planned to install mesh screens near irrigation channel outlets to prevent the escape of the fish.

See also

 Queensland Water Commission
 seqwater
 Water security in Australia
 Water supply and sanitation in Australia

External links
 SunWater About Page

References

Water companies of Queensland
Government-owned companies of Queensland